The 2021–22 Georgia Tech Yellow Jackets men's basketball team represented the Georgia Institute of Technology during the 2021–22 NCAA Division I men's basketball season. They were led by sixth-year head coach Josh Pastner and played their home games at Hank McCamish Pavilion as members of the Atlantic Coast Conference.

The Yellow Jackets finished the season 12–20 overall and 5–15 in ACC play to finish in fourteenth place.  As the fourteenth seed in the ACC tournament, they lost to Louisville in the first round.  They were not invited to the NCAA tournament or the NIT.

Previous season
In a season limited due to the ongoing COVID-19 pandemic, the Yellow Jackets finished the 2021–21 season 17–9, 11–6 in ACC play to finish in fourth place. They defeated Miami in the quarterfinals of the ACC tournament and advanced to the championship game after Virginia was forced to withdraw from the tournament after a positive COVID-19 test. They defeated Florida State to win the tournament championship. As a result, they received the conference's automatic bid to the NCAA tournament as the No. 9 seed in the Midwest region. They lost in the first round to Loyola. It was the first time since 2010 that the Yellow Jackets had participated in the NCAA Tournament, and their first ACC Championship since 1993.

Offseason

Departures

Incoming transfers

2021 recruiting class

Roster

Schedule and results

|-
!colspan=9 style=|Exhibition

|-
!colspan=9 style=|Regular season

|-
!colspan=9 style=|ACC tournament

Source

Rankings

*AP does not release post-NCAA Tournament rankings and the Coaches Poll did not release a Week 1 poll.

References

Georgia Tech Yellow Jackets men's basketball seasons
Georgia Tech
2021 in sports in Georgia (U.S. state)
2022 in sports in Georgia (U.S. state)